The Boeing 747SP (for Special Performance) is a shortened version of the Boeing 747 wide-body airliner, designed for a longer range.

Boeing needed a smaller aircraft to compete with the McDonnell Douglas DC-10 and Lockheed L-1011 TriStar tri-jet wide-bodies, introduced in 1971/1972. Pan Am requested a 747-100 derivative to fly between New York and the Middle East, a request also shared by Iran Air, and the first order came from Pan Am in 1973.

The variant first flew on July 4, 1975, was approved by the Federal Aviation Administration on February 4, 1976, and entered service that year with Pan Am.

Its main deck doors are reduced to four on each side to suit its lower capacity. The vertical and horizontal tailplane are larger and its wing flaps have been simplified.

One 747SP was modified into the Stratospheric Observatory for Infrared Astronomy (SOFIA).

The last example was delivered in 1987; some were converted to transports of heads of state.
Sales did not meet the expected 200 units, and only 45 aircraft were ultimately produced.

Development 

The idea for the 747SP came from a request by Pan Am for a 747 variant capable of carrying a full payload non-stop on its longest route between New York and Tehran. Joined with Pan Am's request was Iran Air; their joint interest was for a high capacity airliner capable of covering Pan Am's New York–Middle Eastern routes and Iran Air's planned New York-Tehran route (New York to Tehran was the longest non-stop commercial flight in the world for a short time). The aircraft was launched with Pan Am's first order in 1973, and the first example delivered in 1976.

A shorter derivative of the 747-100, the SP was developed to target two market requirements. The first was a need to compete with the DC-10 and L-1011 while maintaining commonality with the 747, which in its standard form was too large for many routes. Until the arrival of the 767, Boeing lacked a mid-sized wide-body to compete in this segment. The second market requirement was an aircraft suitable for the ultra-long-range routes emerging in the mid-1970s following the joint request. These routes needed not only longer range, but also higher cruising speeds. Boeing could not afford to develop an all-new design, instead opting to shorten the 747 and optimize it for speed and range, at the expense of capacity.

Originally designated 747SB for "short body", it was later nicknamed "Sutter's balloon" by employees after 747 chief engineer Joe Sutter. Boeing later changed the production designation to 747SP for "special performance", reflecting the aircraft's greater range and higher cruising speed. Production of the 747SP ran from 1976 to 1983. However, a VIP order for the Abu Dhabi Amiri Flight led Boeing to produce one last SP in 1987. Pan Am was the launch customer for the 747SP, taking the first delivery, Clipper Freedom, on March 5, 1976.

The 747SP was the longest-range airliner available until the 747-400 entered service in 1989. Despite its technical achievements, the SP never sold as well as Boeing hoped. Increased fuel prices in the mid-1970s to early 1980s, the SP's heavy wings, high cost, and reduced capacity, and the increased ranges of forthcoming airliners were some of the many factors that contributed to its low sales. Only 45 were built, and, of those remaining, most are used by operators in the Middle East. However, some of the engineering work on the 747SP was reused with the development of the 747-300. In the 747SP, the upper deck begins over the section of fuselage that contains the wingbox, not ahead of the wingbox (as is the case with the 747-100 and 747-200). This same design was used in the 747-300 and newer 747-400, resulting in a stretched upper deck.

Design 
Apart from having a significantly shorter fuselage and one fewer cabin door per side, the 747SP differs from other 747 variants in having simplified flaps and a taller vertical tail to counteract the decrease in yaw moment-arm from the shortened fuselage. The 747SP uses single-piece flaps on the trailing edges, rather than the smaller triple-slotted flaps of standard 747s.

The SP could accommodate 230 passengers in a 3-class cabin or 331 (303 economy, 28 business) in a 2-class cabin, and a maximum of 400 passengers in one class.

Variants 

From 2007 until 2022, a specially modified 747SP was used as the Stratospheric Observatory for Infrared Astronomy (SOFIA) astronomical observatory, operated jointly by NASA and Germany's DLR. A former Pan Am and United Airlines aircraft acquired in 1997, its airframe was modified to carry a 2.5-meter-diameter reflecting telescope to high altitude, above 99.9% of the light-absorbing water vapor in the atmosphere. The telescope and its detectors covered a wide wavelength range from the near infrared to the sub-millimeter region; no window material is transparent over this whole range, so the observations were made through a  square hole in the port upper quarter of the rear fuselage, aft of a new pressure bulkhead. A sliding door covered the aperture when the telescope was not in use. Astronomers take data and control the instrument from within the normally pressurized cabin. Originally delivered to Pan Am and named "Clipper Lindbergh", the name was displayed in script on the port side of the aircraft.

In September 2022, SOFIA ceased operations after the conclusion of its final mission. The retirement was made both on the grounds of cost and suitability for the requirements of the decade to come.  The aircraft was later flown to the Pima Air & Space Museum in Tucson, Arizona to be put on public display.

Operators

Deliveries 
Forty-five 747SP aircraft were built between 1974 and 1987. The production line was ended in 1982 but reopened in 1987 to fulfill an order for the Abu Dhabi Amiri Flight.

Current operators 

As of September 2022, there were just three Boeing 747SPs still in active service, with 18 more stored and one preserved. The remaining 23 were either scrapped, otherwise destroyed, or abandoned.

In 2016, the last 747SP in commercial service was withdrawn from service after 40 years by Iran Air. In 2020, the last aircraft in governmental use was stored by the Royal Flight of Oman, and one of two aircraft remaining in VIP use by the Las Vegas Sands was written off by accidental damage sustained during Hurricane Laura. The latter aircraft was scrapped soon afterwards. The retirement of the SOFIA observatory left only three aircraft still in use as of September 2022, two of them for research purposes:

2 Pratt & Whitney Canada (used as an engine testbed)
1 Las Vegas Sands

Former operators 
This list also includes organizations that used the aircraft temporarily, besides main operators.

Records 
There were three significant commercial around-the-world record-setting flights flown by 747SP: two operated by Pan Am and the other operated by United Airlines with the aircraft being "loaned" to Friendship Foundation, in order to raise money for the foundation. Those flights are:
 Liberty Bell Express—Flown from New York/JFK May 1–3, 1976. 2 stopovers at Indira Gandhi International Airport, New Delhi and Tokyo-Haneda Airport. The round-the-world flight took 46 hours and 26 minutes over 23,137 miles.
 Pan Am Flight 50—to celebrate the 50th anniversary of Pan Am. Flown October 28–30, 1977 from San Francisco/SFO, with a time duration of 54 hours, 7 minutes, 12 seconds. 3 stopovers at Heathrow Airport, Cape Town and Auckland. Flight 50 flew over both the North Pole and the South Pole.
 Friendship One—Flown January 29–31, 1988 from Seattle/SEA, to raise funds for Friendship Foundation. Two stopovers were made, at Athens and Taipei. The record lasted less than a month, as it was beaten by a Gulfstream IV. The round-the-world flight took 35 hours and 54 minutes over 23,125 miles.
 In 1976 a Boeing 747SP (ZS-SPA) of South African Airways was flown non-stop from the Boeing Company factory in Seattle to Cape Town during its delivery flight. This was a world record for an un-refuelled commercial aircraft, this record was held for over a decade.

Incidents and accidents 
 On February 19, 1985, China Airlines Flight 006, a 747SP-09 (aircraft registration N4522V) with 274 passengers and crew on board on a flight from Chiang Kai-shek Airport to Los Angeles suffered an inflight failure on engine number four. While the flight crew attempted to restore power the aircraft rolled to the right and started a steep descent from the cruising altitude of 41,000 feet, pulling 4.8 G and 5.1 G on two occasions. Two passengers were injured and the aircraft suffered major structural damage.
 On October 5, 1998, a South African Airways Boeing 747SP-44 (ZS-SPF) operated by LAM Mozambique Airlines suffered an engine failure shortly after take-off from Maputo International Airport, Mozambique. The no. 3 engine suffered an uncontained failure – flying debris caused damage to the no. 4 engine and the wing. A fire broke out that couldn't be extinguished immediately, forcing an emergency landing. All 66 people on board survived. As a result, the aircraft was withdrawn from service and scrapped.
During the Yemeni Civil War, a 747SP owned by the President of Yemen, 7O-YMN, was struck by gunfire on March 19, 2015. Subsequent photographs show that the aircraft was then completely destroyed by fire afterwards.
 On August 27, 2020, a Las Vegas Sands Boeing 747SP-21 (VQ-BMS) was damaged beyond repair during Hurricane Laura while undergoing maintenance. The right-hand wing fractured and the wing of another aircraft, believed to be BBJ N836BA, cut through the forward fuselage.

Aircraft on display 
 An ex-South African Airways 747SP nicknamed "Maluti" is on static display at Rand Airport in South Africa, where it is maintained by the South African Airways Museum Society.
 After its retirement by NASA, 747SP N747NA, SOFIA (ex-Pan Am Clipper Lindbergh) is scheduled to be preserved at the Pima Air & Space Museum in Tucson, Arizona.

Specifications 

Note

See also

References

Further reading

External links 

 boeing.com – 747 family
 747SP fan site – Production Lists & Photographs

Boeing 747
1970s United States airliners
Quadjets
Aircraft first flown in 1975
Double-deck aircraft